The 1980 African Cup of Champions Clubs was the 16th edition of the annual international club football competition held in the CAF region (Africa), the African Cup of Champions Clubs. It determined that year's club champion of association football in Africa.

The tournament was played by 31 teams and was used a playoff scheme with home and away matches. Canon Yaoundé from Cameroon won that final, and became for the third time CAF club champion.

First round

|}
1

Second round

|}

Quarter-finals

|}

Semi-finals

|}

Final

Champion
{| width=95%
|- align=center
|African Cup of Champions Clubs 1980 Canon YaoundéThird title'|}

Top scorers
The top scorers from the 1980 African Cup of Champions Clubs are as follows:

External links
Champions' Cup 1980 - rsssf.com''

1980 in African football
African Cup of Champions Clubs